Mariona Rebull is a 1947 Spanish historical drama film directed by José Luis Sáenz de Heredia and starring José María Seoane, Blanca de Silos and Sara Montiel. The film is an adaptation of the 1943 novel of the same title by Ignasi Agustí. The film is set amongst the high society of late nineteenth century Barcelona. Mariona Rebull is unhappily married, and begins an affair. She is eventually killed on 7 November 1893 when an anarchist Santiago Salvador throws a bomb into the stalls of the Gran Teatre del Liceu, Barcelona's opera house. This was based on a real-life incident.

Cast
 José María Seoane as Joaquín Rius 
 Blanca de Silos as Mariona Rebull  
 Sara Montiel as Lula  
 Alberto Romea as Señor Llobet 
 Tomás Blanco as Ernesto Villar  
 Carlos Muñoz as Arturo 
 José María Lado
 Adolfo Marsillach as Darío  
 Fernando Sancho as Señor Roig 
 Rafael Bardem as Señor Llopis  
 Mario Berriatúa as Desiderio  
 Manrique Gil as Señor Pàmies  
 Ramón Martori
 Cándida Suarez
 Rosita Yarza
 Carolina Giménez as Muchacha en El Liceo

References

Bibliography
 Helio San Miguel, Lorenzo J. Torres Hortelano. World Film Locations: Barcelona. Intellect Books, 2013.

External links 

1947 films
1940s historical drama films
Spanish historical drama films
1940s Spanish-language films
Films set in Barcelona
Films set in the 1890s
Films based on Spanish novels
Films directed by José Luis Sáenz de Heredia
Spanish black-and-white films
1947 drama films
1940s Spanish films